Sir Roderick Sinclair Meiklejohn, KBE, CB (30 May 1876 – 18 January 1962) was an English civil servant. Educated at Hertford College, Oxford, he entered the civil service in 1899; initially serving in the War Office, from 1902 he was in HM Treasury. From 1928 to 1939, he was First Civil Service Commissioner.

References 

1876 births
1962 deaths
English civil servants
Alumni of Hertford College, Oxford
Knights Commander of the Order of the British Empire
Companions of the Order of the Bath